The Ministry of Internal Affairs of Artsakh () also known as the Ministry of the Interior is an official government agency of the partially recognized Republic of Artsakh, serving as the executive law enforcement body in the state. It follows an organization similar to that of the Police of Armenia.

Predecessors and pre-history 
After the ceding of Nagorno-Karabakh  to the Azerbaijan SSR, there became a need to form a new police force. On 4 August 1923, the People's Commissariat for Internal Affairs of the Nagorno-Karabakh Autonomous Oblast was established. In the years following the First Nagorno-Karabakh War, the Nagorno-Karabakh Republic created its own police force, with the local National Assembly adopting in 2001, the law "On Police".

Modern ministry  
On 25 January 2021, Artsakh President Arayik Harutyunyan signed a decree to combine the Police and State Emergency Service into a new Ministry of Internal Affairs. On 11 March 2014, Police Day in Artsakh was declared to be celebrated on 16 April.

List of heads 
The following is a list of heads from 1990–Present:
 Karen Grigory Sargsyan (26 January 2021 – Present)

See also
 Artsakh Defence Army
 Law enforcement in the Republic of Artsakh
 Ministry of Internal Affairs (Armenia)

References

External links 
Ministry of Internal Affairs official website

Internal affairs ministries
Government of the Republic of Artsakh
Politics of the Republic of Artsakh
Republic of Artsakh